Grzegorz Kowalski (born 12 January 1963) is a retired Polish football midfielder and later manager, currently in charge of Ślęza Wrocław.

References

1963 births
Living people
Polish footballers
Association football midfielders
Śląsk Wrocław players
Kelantan FA players
Ekstraklasa players
I liga players
II liga players
Polish football managers
Śląsk Wrocław managers
Polish expatriate footballers
Expatriate footballers in East Germany
Expatriate footballers in Germany
Polish expatriate sportspeople in Germany
Expatriate footballers in Malaysia
Polish expatriate sportspeople in Malaysia
People from Włocławek County